Karamat Ali Karamat (1936 – 2022) was an Indian Urdu language poet, author, literary critic and mathematician. His name is enlisted among those who connected and introduced Odisha's Urdu literature to the Urdu speaking world. Some of his works included Aab e Khizar (1963), Shu'aon Ki Salīb (1972), Izāfi Tanqīd (1977), Lafzon Kā Aasmān (1984) and Lafzon Kā Ākāsh (2000). He was conferred with the 2004 Sahitya Akademi Translation Prize for his Urdu translation Lafzon Kā Ākāsh.

Early life and education 
Karamat Ali Karamat was born in Odia Bazar, Cuttack on 23 September 1936 to Rahamat Ali Rahmat and Wazeerun Nisa. His hometown is Rasūlpur (Sūngra) in Cuttack district.

His father Rahmat Ali Rahmat (1891–1963) was a year senior to Netaji Subhas Chandra Bose (1897–1945) during his education at Ravenshaw Collegiate School, and it is noteworthy that both (Bose and Rahmat) used to get the first position in their respective classes. He (Rahmat) was a mathematician, a litterateur and a poet of Urdu.

Karamat learned to read the Quran, basic Urdu and Persian from Muhammad Kāzim Sūngravi as he learned Persian from his father also, then he learned Odia science and literature from a tutor named Jadumani Rath and soon got command on mathematics and geometry. After getting his primary education, he completed his 9th standard from Khallikot Collegiate School, Berhampur, then passed his 10th standard (matriculation) with first division from Ravenshaw Collegiate School, Cuttack in 1952. In 1954, he passed the Intermediate examination with first division from Ravenshaw College, Cuttack. He received a B.Sc and an M.Sc from Ravenshaw College in 1956 and 1958 respectively, and also achieved gold medal for his first rank in M.Sc.

In 1978, Karamat registered for Ph.D from Sambalpur University under the supervision of Prof. Mahendranath Mishra and completed his thesis titled “Some Properties of Random Equations” on the topic of Probability theory in Mathematics, and ultimately he received the Doctorate degree on 13 November 1982. His Ph.D dissertation was so liked by the well-known American mathematician Albert Turner Bharucha-Reid, that he included Karamat's research formulas in his book Random Polynomials.

Teaching career 
Karamat joined the Odisha Educational Service as a lecturer in Mathematics on 8 September 1958, and served as lecturer at the Department of Mathematics, S. K. C. G College, Paralakhemundi.

On 13 July 1959, he was appointed a permanent lecturer in the Department of Mathematics at Ravenshaw College, Cuttack and stayed there for a year. Between 1961 and 1963, he was a lecturer at S. K. C. G College, Paralakhemundi, while he lectured at Science College, Angul from 1963 to 1966. In 1966, he was again appointed a lecturer at Ravenshaw College, Cuttack and held this position till 1969. From 1969 to 1979, he was the Reader and Chairman of the Department of Mathematics in Sundargarh College, Sundargarh.

He taught as Reader at Khallikote College, Berhampur during 10 July 1979 and 10 November 1979. After that, he was appointed as the Principal of Kendrapara College and stayed there till 1980. He was a Reader at Buxi Jagabandhu Bidyadhar College, Bhubaneswar between February 1981 and May 1982, and then at Shailabala Women's College, Cuttack from June 1982 to October 1982. From October 1982 to 1986, he was the Vice-principal of Ravenshaw College, Cuttack. Afterthat, he was working as a Professor and Head of Mathematics department at Khallikote Autonomous College, Berhampur from February 1986 to 1989, while he was the Principal of the same college until 1990.

He was appointed as the President of Service Selection Board, Bhubaneswar in 1990, and retired from his government service on 30 June 1995.

Personal life 
Karamat was married to Zubaida Ali, the second daughter of Abdur Rafiq Khan of Talpatak, Jagatsinghpur district on 23 May 1959, with whom he has one son Qutb Kāmran and three daughters; Sanobar Sultāna, Durr e Shahvār and Rafī'a Rubāb.

In January 2005, he achieved the honour of Hajj with his wife. She passed away on 26 January 2020.

Literary works

As a poet and a critic 
Karamat was interested in literature since his college's life. Among his prominent poetry teachers were Rehmat Ali Rehmat and Amjad Najmi. He learned Arabic prosody from Manzar Hasan Desnavi during his study at Ravenshaw College and Mazhar Imam was his advisor on Urdu prose literature during his stay in Cuttack.

He wrote his first ghazal on 15 February 1953 and his first Nazm (poem) on 31 December 1954. In 1963, on the initiative of Mazhar Imam, he compiled and collected the selected poems of Odisha's Urdu poets with their short biographical sketches under the name of Aab e Khizar and introduced them to the Urdu world. In June 1965, a year before the publication of Shabkhoon, he published a bi-monthly magazine called Shakhsar from Cuttack under the editorship of Amjad Najmi.

Being a Urdu Critic, he presented Urdu criticism in a new and rational way, which is proved by his critical essay collections including; Izāfi Tabqīd (1977) and Naye Tanqīdi Masāʼil Aur Imkānāt (2009). He presented the theory of relativity in a way, which expands the theory of Relative criticism, firstly used in the book The Idiom of Poetry (1946) by Frederick Albert Pottle (d. 1987); but the difference between the views of both is that Pottle considered poetry as absolute and criticism as additional and Karamat described both poetry and criticism as additional.

Wahab Ashrafi, while analyzing the criticism of Karamat, has written, that as a poet and critic, Karamat has a special place in literature, and his commitment to mathematics gave a new dimension to his criticism.
According to Unwan Chishti, Karamat's poetry has the color and harmony of "contemporary awareness" that he has creatively expressed it by making the development of science and technology a part of consciousness. Gopi Chand Narang expressed his opinion about Karamat's poetry, that he has long been a believer and admirer of Karamat's poetry and he agrees with Firaq Gorakhpuri's opinion that Karamat's words compel to thought and reflection.

As a translator 
Karamat translated in verse, the poetry or fiction of various Odia poets and fictionists into Urdu and tried to create harmony between Urdu and Odia language and literature and to bring them closer together. Apart from the translations of the Odia poems of Sitakant Mahapatra, he also translated his poetry collection Shabdara Ākāsha into Urdu, named Lafzon Ka Ākash, for which he was awarded the Sahitya Academy Translation Prize (2004) by Gopi Chand Narang in 2005. Furthermore, he translated many poems and fictions of Odia poets and fiction writers into Urdu, that included Bidhu Bhusan Das, Sachi Routray, Chintamani Behera, Ramakanta Rath, Sourindra Barik, Brahmotri Mohanty, Pratibha Satpathy, Niranjan Padhi, Laxmi Narayan Mahapatra, Surendra Mohanty, Manoj Das, Gopinath Mohanty and Ramchandra Behera.

Shamsur Rahman Faruqi mentions that, “My indefatigable friend Karamat Ali Karamat, in addition to being a fine Urdu poet and critic, is also a tireless translator. He has done much to make Odia writers known to Urdu readers.”

Awards and honours 
In addition to the Sahitya Akademi Translation Prize (2004), Karamat was awarded by the Urdu Academies of Bihar, Odisha and Uttar Pradesh, as well as Najmi Academy, Cuttack; All India Mīr Academy, Lucknow; Odisha Mathematical Society and other private institutions for his poetry, literature and mathematical services.

Azizur Rehman Aziz was received Ph.D degree by Ranchi University under the supervision of Wahab Ashrafi for writing his thesis on the subject of Karāmat Alī Karāmat Ka Fikr o Fan.

In 1990, A. Russell translated Karamat's Urdu poems into English titled The Story of The Way And Other Poems together with Karamat himself, and Jayant Mahapatra with A. Russell, Laxmi Narayan Mahapatra, Rajinder Singh Verma, Prafulla Kumar Mohanty, Sailendra Narayan Tripathy, P Asit Kumar, Kamal Masoompuri, Zohra Jabeen and M.A Ahad Compiled English translation of a few more Urdu poems entitled Selected Poems of Karāmat Alī Karāmat in 2012. Similarly, Elizabeth Kurian Mona translated Karamat's Urdu poems into English by the name of God Particle and Other Poems. These English translations have been highly appreciated by Mulk Raj Anand, Javed Iqbal, Tara Charan Rastogi, Shiv K. Kumar, Panos D. Bardis, Azad Gulati, Narendra Paul Singh, Prafulla Kumar Mohanty, Sukrita Paul Kumar, U Atreya Sarma etc. Moreover, Anwar Bhadraki translated Karamat's Urdu poems into Odia named Ekānta ra swara.

Books 
Karamat's books include:
 Aab e Khizar - (1963 – A collection of selected poems of various poets of Odisha and their short biographical sketches)
 Shuāʻon Ki Salīb (1972)
 Izāfi Tabqīd (1977)
 Lafzon Ka Āsmān (1984)
 Lafzon Ka Ākāsh (2002)
 Shākh e Sanobar (2006)
 Naye Tanqīdi Masāʼil Aur Imkānāt (2009)
 Gulkada e Subh o Shām (2016)
 Kulliyāt e Amjad Najmi (2017 – The composition of his teacher Amjad Najmi's poetry collection)
 Māhir e Iqbāliyāt: Shaikh Habībullāh (2019)
 Odia Zabān o Adab - Ek Mutālaʻah (2020)
 Mere Muntakhab Pesh lafz (2021 – A collection of his written Forewords)
 The Story of The Way And Other Poems (translated to English in 1990 by A. Russell)
 Selected Poems of Karāmat Alī Karāmat (translated to English in 2012 by Jayanta Mahapatra and others)
 God Particle and Other Poems (translated to English in 2021 by Elizabeth Kurian Mona)
 Ekānta ra swara (translated in Odia by Anwar Bhadraki)

Death 
Karamat died on 5 August 2022 in Cuttack, while his funeral prayer was performed at Qadam Rasool, Dargah Bazar, Cuttack on 6 August and he was buried in the cemetery of Qadam Rasool.

References

Citations

Bibliography 

 
 
 
 
 
 
 

1936 births
2022 deaths
People from Cuttack
People from Cuttack district
Recipients of the Sahitya Akademi Prize for Translation
Poets from Odisha
Indian male poets
Urdu-language writers
Ravenshaw University alumni
Sambalpur University alumni
Indian literary critics
Indian male essayists
Indian mathematicians
Urdu-language poets
Urdu-language poets from India
20th-century Indian poets
20th-century Indian essayists
20th-century Indian male writers
20th-century Indian translators
20th-century Indian mathematicians